The Superyacht Cup is a yachting race for large sailing yachts that takes place at Nelson's Dockyard in the island of Antigua, Caribbean, every year. It was first organized in 2006 by the Superyacht Cup team from Palma, Majorca.

References

External links

Announcing Antigua Cup
Current Website of the Antigua Cup

Recurring events established in 2006
Sailing competitions in Antigua and Barbuda